Crai is a village in the Brecon Beacons National Park in the county of Powys, Wales and the historic county of Breconshire. The population of Cray community at the 2011 census was 241. Within the community are the hamlet of Felin-Crai and many dispersed farms around the valley of the Afon Crai. The river is dammed 2 km / 1.5 mi southwest of the village to form Cray Reservoir. Crai means fresh, raw water. The famous Llywel Stone (see Llywel) was found close to the Crai/Trecastle boundary. A history of the village is contained in Lewis, D. Craionog: Hanes plwyf Defynog : yn cynnwys y rhanbarthau cynlynol; Crai, Glyntawy, Senni, Glyntarell, a Maescar. Merthyr Tydfil : H. W. Southey a'i Feibion, Cyf, Argrffwyr, 1911.

References

External links
Images of Crai and surrounding area on Geograph website

Cray, Powys
Villages in Powys
Villages in the Brecon Beacons National Park